Jurignac is a former commune in the Charente department in southwestern France. On 1 January 2016, it was merged into the new commune Val-des-Vignes.

Population

Sights
The commune contains the distillery of the cognac Andre Duclos, a building from the late nineteenth century which is now a music hall. It is the only listed building in the commune. St. Peter's Church is the main place of worship.

See also
Communes of the Charente department

References

Former communes of Charente